Vandyke-Heath House, also known as the Jacob C. Vandyke House, is a historic home located near Townsend, New Castle County, Delaware.  The house was built in three stages. The earliest section dates to the late-18th century, and was a -story, three bay log structure measuring 16 feet by 21 feet. It was raised to a full two stories in the mid-19th century and a -story, two-bay frame wing was added.  A two-story, two bay addition was built in the late-19th century.  It is in the Federal style.

It was listed on the National Register of Historic Places in 1992.

On November 2, 2017, the structure suffered significant fire damage.

References

Houses on the National Register of Historic Places in Delaware
Federal architecture in Delaware
Houses in New Castle County, Delaware
National Register of Historic Places in New Castle County, Delaware